Andrei Nicolae Bănică (born 23 November 1977 in Constanţa) is a Romanian rower.

References

External links
 
 
 

1977 births
Living people
Romanian male rowers
Sportspeople from Constanța
Olympic rowers of Romania
Rowers at the 1996 Summer Olympics
Rowers at the 2000 Summer Olympics
World Rowing Championships medalists for Romania